A cowling is an engine cover.

Cowling or Cowlinge may also refer to:

Places in the United Kingdom 

Cowling, Craven, a village, parish and geographical area in the district of Craven, North Yorkshire
Cowling, Hambleton, a village in the parish of Burrill with Cowling, North Yorkshire
Cowlinge, a village in Suffolk

People 

Belinda Cowling, French medical researcher
Bruce Cowling (1919–1986), American actor
Gemma Cowling, Australian model
Maurice Cowling (1926–2005), British historian
Thomas Cowling (1906–1990), British astronomer

See also 

 Carleton College Cowling Arboretum
 Cowl (disambiguation)